Norman R. Hays (November 9, 1891 – January 15, 1966) was a justice of the Iowa Supreme Court from October 3, 1946, to August 31, 1965, appointed from Marion County, Iowa.

References

External links

Justices of the Iowa Supreme Court
1891 births
1966 deaths
20th-century American judges